Hamar Stiftstidende is a former Norwegian daily newspaper, published in Hamar, Norway from 1847 to 1971. Its original name was Hamar Budstikke, later Hamar Budstikke og Stiftstidende, then Hamar Stiftstidende. In 1872 editor Olaus Arvesen was forced to leave after disagreements with the owners, and started the competing Oplandenes Avis. Hamar Stiftstidende was a supporter for the Conservative Party, and later also the Liberal Left Party. The newspaper merged with Oplandenes Avis in 1916. In 1971 the newspaper was bankrupt.

References

Further reading

1971 disestablishments in Norway
1847 establishments in Norway
Conservative Party (Norway) newspapers
Defunct newspapers published in Norway
Free-minded Liberal Party newspapers
Mass media in Hamar
Norwegian-language newspapers
Newspapers established in 1847
Publications disestablished in 1971